The 2002–03 SK Rapid Wien season is the 105th season in club history.

Squad statistics

Goal scorers

Fixtures and results

Bundesliga

League table

Cup

References

2002-03 Rapid Wien Season
Austrian football clubs 2002–03 season